Abdou Mbow (born January 9, 1976, in Thies) is a Senegalese politician. He is the fourth vice president of the Senegalese National Assembly. Mbow is the spokesperson for the Alliance for the Republic (Senegal).

References 

Living people
1976 births
Senegalese politicians
21st-century Senegalese politicians
People from Thiès Region